Ustyuzhna is a town and the administrative center of Ustyuzhensky District in Vologda Oblast, Russia, located on the Mologa River,  west of Vologda, the administrative center of the oblast. Population:

History

Considered to have been founded in the 11th century, it was first mentioned, as Zhelezny Ustyug, in 1252, and in the following centuries was called variously Ustyuzhna Zheleznopolskaya, Ustizhna, Ustizhnya, Ustyuzhnya, and Yustyzhnya. In the 16th–18th centuries it was known mostly as Ustyuzhna-Zheleznaya or Ustyuzhna-Zheleznopolskaya, but since 1808 it had mostly been referred to by its modern name. The origin of the name is unclear, though it may be related to that of Ustyug.

In 1252, Ustyuzhna was a part of the Principality of Uglich. It was situated on the shortest route from Novgorod to the basin of the Northern Dvina, which caused an interest of the Novgorod Republic. In the 14th century, Novgorod made several attempts to establish control over the town. During the Time of Troubles, the Polish Army laid a siege on Ustyuzhna, but did not manage to conquer the town. In the 16th and 17th centuries, the territory became one of the most important centers of metal production in Russia, second only to Tula. Between 1702 and 1714, Izhinsky iron-making plant, built by the Admiralty, existed in Ustyuzhna, making it a major producer of arms.

In the course of the administrative reform carried out in 1708 by Peter the Great, Ustyuzhna was included into Ingermanland Governorate (known since 1710 as Saint Petersburg Governorate) and named one of the towns constituting the governorate. In 1727, separate Novgorod Governorate was split off, which included Ustyuzhna as a part of its Belozersk Province. In 1738, Ustyuzhna was chartered and became the seat of Ustyuzhensky Uyezd. In 1776, the uyezd was transferred to Novgorod Viceroyalty. In 1796, the viceroyalty was abolished and Ustyuzhensky Uyezd was transferred to Novgorod Governorate.

In June 1918, five uyezds of Novgorod Governorate, including Ustyuzhensky Uyezd, were split off to form Cherepovets Governorate, with the administrative center in Cherepovets. On August 1, 1927, Cherepovets Governorate was abolished and its territory became Cherepovets Okrug of Leningrad Oblast. At the same time, uyezds were abolished and Ustyuzhensky District was established, with the administrative center in Ustyuzhna. On September 23, 1937, Ustyuzhensky District was transferred to newly established Vologda Oblast and remained there ever since.

Administrative and municipal status
Within the framework of administrative divisions, Ustyuzhna serves as the administrative center of Ustyuzhensky District and of Ustyuzhensky Selsoviet of that district, even though it is not a part of the latter. As an administrative division, it is incorporated within Ustyuzhensky District as the town of district significance of Ustyuzhna. As a municipal division, the town of district significance of Ustyuzhna is incorporated within Ustyuzhensky Municipal District as Ustyuzhna Urban Settlement and serves as the administrative center of the municipal district, urban settlement, and of Ustyuzhenskoye Rural Settlement, even though it is not a part of the latter.

Economy

Industry
The main industrial enterprise in Ustyuzhna is a cheese production factory.

Transportation
A114 Highway, connecting Vologda to Cherepovets and St. Petersburg, passes north of Ustyuzhna. There is a road connecting Ustyuzhna with the highway. Ustyuzhna is also connected by roads with Tver via Vesyegonsk, with Bezhetsk via Sandovo, and with Borovichi via Pestovo. There are also local roads.

The closest railway station is located in Sandovo.

Culture and recreation

Ustyuzhna contains thirty-nine objects classified as cultural and historical heritage by Russian federal law and additionally ninety-seven objects classified as cultural and historical heritage of local importance. Ustyuzhna is a historical town with the well-preserved center from the 19th century.

The Ustyuzhensky District Museum is located in Ustyuzhna.

It is believed that the plot of The Government Inspector, a comedy by Russian playwright Nikolai Gogol, is based on the real story which took place in Ustyuzhna in the beginning of the 19th century.

References

Notes

Sources

External links
Ustiuzhna: Vologda's Western Treasure

Cities and towns in Vologda Oblast
Ustyuzhensky Uyezd